St Hubertus & Oak Bay Estate Winery is a Canadian wine grower and producer. It is in Kelowna, British Columbia, in the Okanagan Valley wine region.

History 

Scenes of St Hubertus Estate Winery

The St Hubertus & Oak Bay Vineyards were originally planted in 1928 by J.W. Hughes 
during a time when good agricultural land was plentiful. The vineyards of St Hubertus and Oak Bay are some of the oldest in the Okanagan Valley.

In 1984 Leo Gebert, originally from Switzerland, came to the Okanagan to start a winery. Two years later his younger brother Andy joined him. Since 1984 the Gebert Family uses sustainable farming practices on their 76-acre vineyard to produce wines that reflects the terroir of the north Okanagan Valley under the St Hubertus (50 acres) & Oak Bay (26 acres) Label. This was officially recognized in 2005 through the Environmental Farm Plan. In 1991 the two brothers Leo and Andy Gebert changed direction and started producing their own wines. Today the winery produces on average 14'000 cases of wine annually. All wines created by St Hubertus and Oak Bay are made with estate grown grapes and crafted and bottled on site; in keeping with the traditions of an estate winery.

In the summer of 2003 the Okanagan Mountain Park Fire,  destroyed the original winery and over 200 homes in the surrounding area.

Vineyards 

St Hubertus Estate Winery includes two vineyards, those of St Hubertus Vineyard and Oak Bay Vineyard. Wines aged in stainless steel tanks are bottle under the St Hubertus label while those aged in French and American oak barrels are bottled under the Oak Bay label. The vineyards are located beside one another along Okanagan Lake in Kelowna, British Columbia.

Scenes from present day St Hubertus Estate Winery

Known For 

St Hubertus Estate Winery is one of the only wineries in British Columbia producing Chasselas. Chasselas is the primary white grape grown in Switzerland  and also known as Fendant. The wineries most popular red is the full flavoured Marechal Foch

References

External links 
 

Wineries of British Columbia
Companies based in Kelowna